Death of Yazdgerd (or alternatively translated as Death of the King; and whose original subtitle translates "Regicide") is a Persian play about the death of Yazdegerd III by Bahram Beyzai, often considered his magnum opus, which he adapted into a film of the same name.

Text

In English
The play was translated into English by Manuchehr Anvar and published in Tehran. Another English translation is named Death of the King, published in Stories from the Rains of Love and Death: Four Plays from Iran in Canada.

Notable productions

Premiere
Beyzai produced this play for the first time in the City Theater of Tehran from 10 September 1979 to 29 October. Susan Taslimi and Mehdi Hashemi played the leading roles.

Film adaptation

English premiere
Onelight Theatre produced this play in Canada in 2005.

Bengali premiere
Sudipto Chatterjee translated and produced this play in India in 2014.

References

1979 plays
Books about Iran
Iran in fiction
Persian-language books
Persian plays adapted into films
Plays by Bahram Beyzai
Plays set in the 7th century